Sir William Jardine, 7th Baronet of Applegarth FRS FRSE FLS FSA (23 February 1800 – 21 November 1874) was a Scottish naturalist. He is known for his editing of a long series of natural history books, The Naturalist's Library.

Life and work

Jardine was born on 23 February 1800 at 28 North Hanover Street in Edinburgh, the son of Sir Alexander Jardine, 6th baronet of Applegarth and his wife, Jane Maule. He was educated in both York and Edinburgh then studied medicine at Edinburgh University.

From 1817 to 1821 he lodged with Rev Dr Andrew Grant at James Square, an arrangement made by his father. Grant was minister of St Andrew's Church on George Street.

In his early years, aged only 25, he was elected a fellow of the Royal Society of Edinburgh his proposer being Sir David Brewster.

He was a co-founder of the Berwickshire Naturalists' Club, and contributed to the founding of the Ray Society. He was "keenly addicted to field-sports, and a master equally of the rod and the gun". While ornithology was his main passion, he also studied ichthyology, botany and geology. His book on fossil burrows and traces, the Ichnology of Annandale, included fossils from his ancestral estate. He was the first to coin the term ichnology, and this was the first book written on the subject. His private natural history museum and library are said to have been the finest in Britain.

Jardine made natural history available to all levels of Victorian society by editing the hugely popular forty volumes of The Naturalist's Library (1833–1843) issued and published by his brother in law, the Edinburgh printer and engraver, William Home Lizars. The series was divided into four main sections: Ornithology (14 volumes), Mammalia (13 volumes), Entomology (7 volumes), and Ichthyology (6 volumes); each prepared by a leading naturalist. James Duncan wrote the insect volumes. The artists responsible for the illustrations included Edward Lear. The work was published in Edinburgh by W. H. Lizars. The frontispiece is a portrait of Pierre André Latreille.

His other publications included an edition of Gilbert White's Natural History of Selborne which re-established White's reputation, Illustrations of Ornithology (1825–1843), and an affordable edition of Alexander Wilson's Birds of America.

Jardine described of a number of bird species, alone or in conjunction with his friend Prideaux John Selby. He died on 21 November 1874 in Sandown, Isle of Wight.

Family and descendants
He was married to Jane Home Lizars, and through her was brother-in-law to John Lizars FRSE and William Home Lizars.
After Lady Jardine's death he married the daughter of the Rev. William Samuel Symonds, the well-known geologist.

Jardine's daughter, Catherine Dorcas Maule Jardine, married Hugh Edwin Strickland and produced many of the illustrations for Illustrations of Ornithology (identifiable by her initials, CDMS).

The Olympic rower Sir Matthew Pinsent is a direct descendant of Jardine.

Bibliography
Jardine wrote many books and edited the series and wrote many of the books for The Naturalist's Library. The books are listed below by publication date with those of The Naturalist's Library under a separate heading.

1825 to 1843, Illustrations of Ornithology, written with Prideaux John Selby in four volumes:
Volume I 
Volume II
Volume III
Volume IV
1848, Contributions to Ornithology for 1848: Vols. I and II
1850, Contributions to Ornithology for 1850: Vols. III and IV
1851, The Natural History of Selborne, by Gilbert White with additions, supplementary notes a short biography of Reverend Gilbert White by Jardine
1853, Contributions to Ornithology for 1852: Vol. V
1858, Memoirs of Hugh Edwin Strickland, M.A.

The Naturalist's Library
Jardine edited the series of books that were published a part of The Naturalist's Library, and include (in the order in which they were published):
1833, Ornithology: Humming Birds: Part I, by Jardine with a memoir of Carl Linnaeus
1833, The Natural History of Monkeys, by Jardine with a memoir of Comte de Buffon
1833, Ichthyology: British Fishes: Part II, by Robert Hamilton with a memoir of Alexander von Humboldt
undated, Ornithology: Humming Birds: Part II, by Jardine with a memoir of Thomas Pennant
1834, Mammalia: Vol. II: The Felinae, by Jardine with a memoir of Georges Cuvier
1834, The Natural History of Gallinaceous Birds: Vol. I, by Jardine with a memoir of Aristotle
1835, The Natural History of Fishes of the Perch Family, by Jardine with a memoir of Joseph Banks
1835, Entomology: Vol. III: British Butterflies, by James Duncan with a memoir of Abraham Gottlob Werner
1836, The Natural History of Parrots, by Prideaux J. Selby with plates by Edward Lear and a memoir of Thomas Bewick
1836, Mammalia: Vol. V: Pachyderms, by Jardine with a memoir of Hans Sloane 
1836, The Natural History of British Moths, Sphinxes, &c., by James Duncan with a memoir of Maria Sibylla Merian
1837, The Natural History of the Ordinary Cetacea or Whales, by Jardine with a memoir of Bernard Germain de Lacépède
1837, The Natural History of Foreign Butterflies, by James Duncan with a memoir of Jean-Baptiste Lamarck
1837, The Natural History of the Birds of Western Africa, by William Swainson with a memoir of François Levaillant
1838, The Natural History of the Birds of Great Britain and Ireland: Part I: Birds of Prey, by Jardine with a memoir of Robert Sibbald
1838, The Natural Arrangement and Relations of the Family of Flycatchers or Muscicapidae, by William Swainson with a memoir of Albrecht von Haller
1838, A History of British Quadrupeds, by William MacGillivray with a memoir of Ulisse Aldrovandi
1839, The Natural History of the Amphibious Carnivora, Including the Walrus and Seals, Also of the Herbivorous Cetacea, &c., by Robert Hamilton with a memoir of François Péron
1839,  The Natural History of Dogs: Canidae or Genus Canis of Authors: Including Also the Genera Hyaena and Proteles: Vol. I, by Chas. Hamilton Smith with a memoir of Peter Simon Pallas 
1840, The Natural History of Dogs: Canidae or Genus Canis of Authors: Including Also the Genera Hyaena and Proteles: Vol. II, by Chas. Hamilton Smith with a memoir of Félix de Azara
1840, Introduction to Entomology, by James Duncan with memoirs of Jan Swammerdam and Charles De Geer
1841, The Natural History of Marsupialia or Pouched Animals, by G. R. Waterhouse with a memoir of John Barclay
1841, The Natural History of Horses: The Equidae or Genus Equus of Authors, by Chas. Hamilton Smith with a memoir of Conrad Gessner
1841, The Natural History of the Fishes of Guiana: Part I, by Robert H. Schomburgk
1841, The Natural History of Exotic Moths, by James Duncan with a memoir of Pierre André Latreille
1842, The Natural History of the Birds of Great Britain and Ireland: Part III: Rasores and Grallatores, by Jardine with a memoir of John Walker
1842, An Introduction to the Mammalia, by Charles Hamilton Smith with a memoir of Dru Drury
1843,  Ichthyology: Fishes, Particularly Their Structure and Economical Uses, by J. S. Bushnan with a memoir of Hippolito Salviani
1843, The Natural History of the Fishes of Guiana: Part II, by Robert H. Schomburgk with a memoir of Johann Ludwig Burckhardt
1844,  The Natural History of Game-Birds, by Jardine with a memoir of Stamford Raffles
1852, The Natural History of Beetles, by James Duncan with a memoir of John Ray
undated, Ornithology: Pigeons, by Prideaux John Selby with a memoir of Pliny the Elder
1859, Entomology: Bees, by Jardine with a memoir of François Huber
1860, Ichthyology: British Fishes: Part I, by Robert Hamilton with a memoir of Guillaume Rondelet
1860, Ornithology: Birds of Great Britain and Ireland: Part IV, by Jardine with a memoir of Alexander Wilson
1862, Ornithology: Birds of Western Africa: Part I, by W. Swainson with a memoir of James Bruce
1864, The Natural History of the Nectariniadae, or Sun-Birds, by Jardine with a memoir of Francis Willughby
1866, Mammalia: Deer, Antelopes, Camels, &c., by Jardine with a memoir of Petrus Camper
1866, Mammalia: Goats, Sheep, Oxen, &c., by Jardine with a memoir of John Hunter
1866, Ornithology: Parrots, by Prideaux John Selby with a memoir of Thomas Bewick
1866, Ornithology: Birds of Great Britain and Ireland: Part II, by Jardine with a memoir of William Smellie

Later supplements include the following titles: The Natural History of Man, Humming Birds Volume 3 and a single volume that collated the memoirs of "great naturalists".

See also
:Category:Taxa named by Sir William Jardine
Jardine baronets

References

External links

 Obituary in Nature, Vol. 11, 74–76, 26 November 1874
 Obituary in Osbert Salvin (Editor), Ibis, Quarterly Journal of Ornithology, Vol. V, page 522, 1875
 
 
 "Sir William Jardine" lithograph by Thomas Herbert Maguire, printed by M & N Hanhart c. 1851 at the National Portrait Gallery
 Jardine, William (1833) The Natural History of Humming-Birds, Vol. 1 - digital facsimile from the Linda Hall Library

1800 births
1874 deaths
Alumni of the University of Edinburgh
Baronets in the Baronetage of Nova Scotia
Fellows of the Royal Society
Writers from Edinburgh
Scottish ornithologists
Scottish naturalists
Scientists from Edinburgh
Fellows of the Linnean Society of London
Fellows of the Society of Antiquaries of London
Fellows of the Royal Society of Edinburgh